The orange threadtail or ochre threadtail (Nososticta solida) is an Australian damselfly in the family Platycnemididae.
They are medium-sized with a length of around 35mm. Orange threadtails can be found near semi-shaded running water, and usually rest on plants at the water's edge. Orange threadtails may be seen all year round. In Victoria they occur at lower altitudes during summer, though further north they can be seen in spring and autumn. When at rest, Nososticta damselflies hold their wings closely folded up vertically over their thorax. The male threadtails have an orange-yellow thorax with black patterns. Their abdomen is narrow, black in colour with yellow strips. There is a brown yellow colour at the base of their wings. Females are the same size as the males. They are pale brown in colour and have the same black patterns as the males.

Distribution 
Orange threadtails are found in eastern Australian States: Queensland, New South Wales, Australian Capital Territory and Victoria.

Gallery

See also
 List of Dragonfly species of Australia
 Brisbane Insects

References 

Platycnemididae
Insects of Australia
Insects described in 1860
Taxa named by Hermann August Hagen